was an admiral in the Imperial Japanese Navy in World War II. An experienced aviator, he is sometimes credited with being the first to use the kamikaze attack, although official accounts may have been invented for propaganda purposes. Arima personally led an air attack against United States Navy Task Force 38 in the Formosa Air Battle and was killed in action.

Biography
Arima was born in Ijuin village (present day Hioki city), Kagoshima prefecture. He graduated from the 43rd class of the Imperial Japanese Naval Academy in 1915. He was ranked 33rd in a class of 96 cadets. As a midshipman, he was assigned to the cruiser  on its 1915 long distance navigational training voyage from Sasebo to Chemulpo, Dairen, Chinkai, Maizuru and Toba. He stayed with Iwate on its cruise the following year to Hong Kong, Singapore, Fremantle, Melbourne, Sydney, Wellington, Auckland, Jaluit Atoll, Ponape, and Truk. On his return, he was commissioned as an ensign assigned to the battleship .

He returned to school, graduating from the 26th class of Naval War College (Japan) in 1928 and was promoted to lieutenant commander. After serving as chief gunnery officer on the battleship  and the cruiser , Arima received his first command on 1 December 1937, the converted seaplane tender . He was also promoted to captain the same day.

Arima oversaw several naval air force bases in Japan from 1938–1942, and was then posted as captain of the aircraft carrier  on 25 May 1942. While on Shōkaku, he was in the Guadalcanal campaign, the Battle of the Eastern Solomons, the Battle of the Santa Cruz Islands, and the Naval Battle of Guadalcanal.

Arima was promoted to rear admiral on 1 May 1943. He was given a combat command on 9 April 1944, and was assigned the 26th Air Flotilla, based at Clark Air Base, on Luzon, in the Philippines. After the Battle of Leyte Gulf, at some date between 13 October and 26 October (accounts vary), Arima personally led an air attack against U.S. Navy Task Force 38 in the Aerial Battle of Taiwan-Okinawa. Before taking off in a Mitsubishi G4M "Betty" twin-engine bomber, he allegedly removed his rank and other insignia, and declared his intention to not return alive. Although Arima indeed did not return, and some damage was caused to the Essex-class aircraft carrier , it is not clear that the damage was from a planned suicide attack, and some accounts state that none of Arima's formation reached their targets.

Another source claims that the first kamikaze attack happened a month earlier. On 12 September 1944, a group of Army pilots of the 31st Fighter Squadron located on Negros Island decided to launch a suicide attack the following morning. First Lieutenant Takeshi Kosai and another sergeant were selected. Strapping two  bombs onto two fighters, they took off on 13 September before dawn, determined to crash into aircraft carriers. They never returned, but there is no record of an enemy plane hitting an American ship on that day.

In the aftermath of the battle, however, Arima was officially credited by the Imperial Japanese Navy with introducing the use of the kamikaze attack, and he was publicized as a hero in the government-controlled Japanese press.

Arima was posthumously promoted to vice admiral. His cenotaph is at the temple of Kozai-ji in his home town of Hioki, Kagoshima.

Notable positions held
Secondary Gunnery Officer, Haruna - 10 December 1928 – 5 September 1929
Senior Staff Officer, Battleship Division 3 – 15 November 1932 – 20 May 1933
Senior Staff Officer, Cruiser Division 7 – 20 May 1933 – 15 November 1934
Senior Staff Officer, Cruiser Division 10 – 12 July 1937 – 20 October 1937
Senior Staff Officer, Cruiser Division 14 – 20 October 1937 – 1 December 1937
Commanding Officer, Kamikawa Maru - 1 December 1937 – 1 September 1938
Commanding Officer, Sasebo Air Group - 1 September 1938 - 15 December 1938
Commanding Officer, Kisarazu Air Group - 15 December 1938 - 15 November 1939
Commanding Officer, Yokohama Air Group - 15 November 1939 - 17 April 1941
Executive Officer & Chief Instructor, Yokosuka Air Group - 17 April 1941 - 10 May 1942
Commanding Officer, Shokaku - 17 May 1942 – 16 February 1943
Commander-in-Chief, 26th Air Flotilla - 9 April 1944 - 15 October 1944 (KIA)

Dates of promotions
Midshipman - 16 December 1915
Ensign - 1 December 1916
Sublieutenant - 1 December 1918
Lieutenant - 1 December 1921
Lieutenant Commander - 1 December 1927
Commander - 15 November 1933
Captain - 1 December 1937
Rear Admiral - 1 May 1943
Vice Admiral - 15 October 1944 (posthumous promotion)

References

Books

External links

Footnotes

1895 births
1944 deaths
Military personnel from Kagoshima Prefecture
Kamikaze pilots
Imperial Japanese Navy admirals
Japanese admirals of World War II
Japanese military personnel killed in World War II
Aviators killed by being shot down